Lacayo is a surname. Notable people with the surname include:

Benjamín Lacayo Sacasa (1893–1959), Nicaraguan politician and President of Nicaragua
Ernesto Lacayo (born 1989), American football player
José Antonio Lacayo de Briones y Palacios (1679–1756), Spanish general and colonial governor
Júnior Lacayo (born 1995), Honduran footballer
Marianela Lacayo (born 1981), Nicaraguan model and journalist
Rafael Lacayo (born 1998), Nicaraguan sports shooter
Rossana Lacayo (born 1956), Nicaraguan photographer, scriptwriter, and filmmaker